The 32nd Annual GMA Dove Awards were held on April 5, 2001 recognizing accomplishments of musicians for the year 2000. The show was held at the Grand Ole Opry House in Nashville, Tennessee, and was hosted by Michael W. Smith.

Nominees
Winners are listed in bold type.

Main categories

Song of the Year
 "Dive"; Steven Curtis Chapman; Sparrow songs, Peach Hill Songs BMI))
 "Don't Look at Me"; Stacie Orrico, Mark Heimermann; Fun Attic Music, Starstruck Music (ASCAP)
 "Every Season"; Nichole Nordeman; Ariose Music (ASCAP)
 "God of Wonders"; Marc Byrd, Steve Hindalong; Storm Boy Music (admin. by The Loving Company) (BMI), New Spring Publishing, Inc., Never Say Never Songs (ASCAP)
 "He's My Son"; Mark Schultz; Mark Schultz Music (BMI), (admin. by The Loving Company)
 "He's Still Waiting by the Wells"; Rodney Griffin; Songs of Greater Vision (BMI)
 "I Could Sing of Your Love Forever"; Martin Smith; Curious Music (BMI)
 "If You Want Me To"; Ginny Owens, Kyle Matthews; BMG Songs (ASCAP), Above The Rim Music (ASCAP)
 "Imagine Me Without You"; Ruby Pérez, Mark Heimermann; Rubert Music Publishing (admin. by Universal Music Publishing) (ASCAP)
 "Redeemer"; Nicole C. Mullen; Seat of the Pants Music (ASCAP), Wordspring Music, Inc., Lil' Jas' Music (SESAC)
 "Written On My Heart"; Eric Foster White, Stephanie Lewis; Universal MCA Music Publishing, Zomba Enterprises, Chalante Music (ASCAP)

Songwriter of the Year
 Marc Byrd
 Steven Curtis Chapman
 Nicole C. Mullen
 Mark Schultz
 Martin Smith

Male Vocalist of the Year
 Fernando Ortega
 Mac Powell
 Mark Schultz
 Michael W. Smith
 Steven Curtis Chapman

Female Vocalist of the Year
 Jaci Velasquez
 Nichole Nordeman
 Nicole C. Mullen
 Rachael Lampa
 Yolanda Adams

Group of the Year
 Avalon
 P.O.D.
 Plus One
 Point of Grace
 Third Day

Artist of the Year
 Jaci Velasquez
 Michael W. Smith
 P.O.D.
 Steven Curtis Chapman
 Third Day

New Artist of the Year
 Mark Schultz
 Mary Mary
 Plus One
 Rachael Lampa
 Stacie Orrico

Producer of the Year
 Brent Bourgeois
 Michael Omartian
 Monroe Jones
 Steve Hindalong
 Brown Bannister

Southern Gospel

Album of the Year
 A Taste of Grace; Karen Peck and New River; Michael Sykes, Phil Johnson; Spring Hill Music Group
 Perfect Candidate; Greater Vision; Wayne Haun, Gerald Wolfe; Daywind Records
 Strong in the Strength; Legacy Five; Roger Bennett, Scott Fowler; Homeland Records
 Vestal and Friends, Vol. 2; Vestal Goodman; Rick Goodman, David Byerley; 
 A Farewell Celebration; Cathedrals; Bill Gaither (gospel singer); Spring Hill
 I Do Believe; Gaither Vocal Band; Bill Gaither, Guy Penrod, Michael Sykes; Spring Hill Music Group

Recorded Song of the Year
 On the Road to Emmaus; For the Sake of the Children; 
"God Is Good All The Time" from God Is Good by Gaither Vocal Band; Tina Sadler; Spring Hill Music Group 
Inspirational Album of the YearHome by Fernando Ortega; John Andrew Schreiner; Myrrh Records 
Inspirational Recorded Song of the Year
"Blessed" from Live For You by Rachael Lampa; Ginny Owens, Cindy Morgan; Word Records 
Pop/Contemporary Album of the YearThis Is Your Time by Michael W. Smith; Bryan Lenox; Reunion Records 
Pop/Contemporary Recorded Song of the Year
"Redeemer" by Nicole C. Mullen; Nicole C. Mullen; Word Records 
Contemporary Gospel Album of the Year (Formerly Contemporary Black Gospel) Purpose By Design by Fred Hammond & Radical For Christ; Fred Hammond; Verity Records 
Contemporary Gospel Recorded Song of the Year (Formerly Contemporary Black Gospel) 
"Alabaster Box" from Alabaster Box by Cece Winans; Janice Sjostran; Wellspring Gospel, Sparrow Records 
Traditional Gospel Album of the Year(Formerly Traditional Black Gospel) You Can Make It by Shirley Caesar; Bubba Smith, Shirley Caesar, Michael Mathis; Myrrh Records, Black Music Division
Traditional Gospel Recorded Song of the Year (Formerly Traditional Black Gospel) 
"We Fall Down" from Live In London & More by Donnie McClurkin; Kyle Matthews; Verity Records 
Urban Recorded Song of the Year
"Shackles (Praise You)" from Thankful by Mary Mary; Warryn Campbell, Erica Atkins, Trecina Atkins; Columbia Records 
Country Album of the Year
(insufficient number of eligible entries) 
Country Recorded Song of the Year
"Baptism" from Inspirational Journey by Randy Travis; Mickey Cates; Atlantic Records 
Rock Album of the YearTree63 by Tree63; Andrew Philip, Eh Holden; Inpop Records 
Rock Recorded Song of the Year
"Sky Falls Down" from Time by Third Day; Mac Powell, Mark Lee, Tai Andersoon, Brad Avery, David Carr; Essential Records 
Hard Music Album of the YearAbove by Pillar; Travis Wyrick; Flickerrecords.Com 
Hard Music Recorded Song of the Year
"Point #1" from Point #1 by Chevelle; Pete Loefller, Sam Loeffler, Joe Loeffler; Squint Entertainment 
Rap/Hip Hop Album of the Year The Plan by Raze; Michael-Anthony Taylor, Tedd Tjornhom; Forefront Records 
Rap/Hip Hop Recorded Song of the Year
"All Around The World" from Power by Raze; Ja'marc Davis, Zarc Porter, Mark Pennells; Forefront Records 
Modern Rock Album of the YearJordan's Sister by Kendall Payne; Ron Aniello, Glen Ballard; Sparrow Records 
Modern Rock Recorded Song of the Year
"Dive" from Supernatural by DC Talk; Toby McKeehan, Michael Tait, Kevin Max, Mark Heimermann; Forefront Records 
Instrumental Album of the YearLights Of Madrid by Phil Keaggy; Phil Keaggy; Word Artisan Records
Praise And Worship Album of the YearOfferings: A Worship Album by Third Day; Monroe Jones, Mac Powell, Mark Lee, Tai Anderson, Brad Avery, David Carr, Joey Canaday; Essential Records
Children's Music Album of the YearA Queen, a King, and a Very Blue Berry - Veggietunes; Kurt Heinecke, Mike Nawrocki; Big Idea Productions 
Musical of the Year
Tie: 2,000 Decembers Ago; Joel Lindsey, Russell Mauldin; Brentwood-Benson Music Publishing 
Tie: Redeemer; Claire Cloninger; Dave Williamson; Word Music
Youth/Children's Musical of the YearFriends 4ever; Karla Worley, Steven V. Tayloy, Seth Worley, Peter Kipley, Michael W. Smith; Word Music
Choral Collection Album of the Year God Is Working; Carol Cymbala; Brooklyn Tabernacle Music 
Special Event Album of the YearCity on a Hill: Songs of Worship and Praise by Jars of Clay, Sixpence None the Richer, Third Day, Caedmon's Call, FFH, The Choir, Gene Eugene, Sonicflood, Peter Furler; Steve Hindalong; Essential Records 
Short Form Music Video of the YearRock The Party (Off The Hook) by P.O.D.; Angela Jones; Marcos Siega; Atlantic Records 
Long Form Music Video of the YearA Farewell Celebration by The Cathedrals; Bryan Bateman, Bill Gaither, Dennis Glore; Spring House Music Group
Recorded Music Packaging of the YearRoaring Lambs; Buddy Jackson, Karinne Caulkins/Jackson; Karinne Caulkins/Jackson; Ben Pearson; Squint Entertainment 
Bluegrass Recorded Song of the Year
"Are You Afraid To Die" from Soldier of the Cross by Ricky Skaggs and Kentucky Thunder; Ira Louvin, Charlie Louvin, Eddie Hill; Skaggs Family Records 
Spanish Language Album of the YearSolo El Amor by Miguel Angel Guerra; Hal S. Batt; Word Latin 
Enhanced CD of the Year
(insufficient number of eligible entries) 
Urban Album of the YearThankful by Mary Mary; Warryn "Baby Dubb" Campbell; Columbia Records 
Bluegrass Album of the YearInspirational Journey'' by Randy Travis; Kyle Lehning; Atlantic Records

References 

Dove Awards
GMA Dove Awards
2001 in American music
2001 in Tennessee
GMA